Alkalibacterium kapii is a Gram-positive and non-spore-forming bacterium from the genus Alkalibacterium which has been isolated from ka-pi (fermented Shrimp paste).

References

Lactobacillales
Bacteria described in 2009